Agustín Manzur (born 29 September 2000) is an Argentine professional footballer who plays as a midfielder for Argentine club Deportivo Maipú.

Club career
Manzur's career began with Godoy Cruz. He was moved into the first-team during the 2017–18 Argentine Primera División season, making two substitute appearances in early 2018 in victories against Chacarita Juniors and Lanús.

On 18 February 2021, Manzur joined Deportivo Maipú on loan. In January 2022, he signed a two-year permanently deal with the club.

International career
Manzur was selected for Argentina U19 training in March 2018.

Career statistics

References

External links
 

2000 births
Living people
Sportspeople from Mendoza, Argentina
Argentine footballers
Association football midfielders
Godoy Cruz Antonio Tomba footballers
Deportivo Maipú players
Argentine Primera División players
Primera Nacional players